Anna Maria Francesca Enriquez Perez de Tagle-Kline (born December 23, 1990) is an American actress and singer. She is known for her roles as Ashley Dewitt on Hannah Montana and Ella Pador on Camp Rock and Camp Rock 2: The Final Jam. She also played Miracle Ross on Cake and was in the 2009 film Fame, in which she starred as Joy Moy. In November 2011, she began starring on Broadway in the Godspell revival at the Circle in the Square theater in New York City.

Early life
Anna Maria Francesca Enriquez Perez de Tagle was born in San Francisco, California, and is of Filipino ancestry. She is the daughter of TV personality Archie Perez de Tagle, and Evelyn Enriquez. Anna Maria is following the footsteps of her paternal family as actress. Her grandmother Sylvia La Torre is also an actress and singer. Her great-grandfather was cine director Olive La Torre, and her great-grandmother, artist Leonora Reyes. Her uncle Bernie Pérez, her aunt Cheche Pérez de Tangle, and her cousin Sarita Pérez de Tagle, are also actors and actresses.

Personal life
She got engaged to her boyfriend, Scott Kline Jr., on November 11, 2018. They were married on June 29, 2019. Actress Uzo Aduba served as her maid of honor. On her 30th birthday, she announced her pregnancy on Instagram.  She gave birth to a girl, Amelia Grace Kline, on June 10, 2021.

Filmography

Film

Television

Web

Theater

As herself

Discography

Music videos

References

External links 
 

1990 births
21st-century American singers
21st-century American actresses
Actresses from California
American child actresses
American actresses of Filipino descent
American people of Spanish descent
American people of Irish descent
American child singers
American female models
American film actresses
American television actresses
Living people
Actresses from San Francisco
Singers from California